Høgh is a Danish surname which was derived from the Old Norse word Haugr meaning a hill or mound.

Notable people with the name include:

 Jes Høgh (born 1966), Danish footballer
 Jonas Høgh-Christensen (born 1981), Danish sailor
 Lars Høgh (born 1959), Danish footballer
 Nicolai Høgh (born 1983), Danish footballer
 Sigvart Høgh-Nilsen (born 1880), Norwegian pianist and composer
 Alex Høgh Andersen (born 1994), Danish actor

See also
 Alex Høgh Andersen (born 1994), Danish actor
 Ralf de la Hogh (fl.1384–1395), English politician
 Høegh (disambiguation)